KZZI (95.9 FM, "The Eagle") is a radio station licensed to serve Belle Fourche, South Dakota, serving the Rapid City, South Dakota market.  The station is owned by Riverfront Broadcasting, LLC. It airs a country music format.

The station was assigned the KZZI call letters by the Federal Communications Commission on April 1, 1995.

KZZI is the radio home of Black Hills State Yellow Jackets athletics, with local radio personality Steve Ammerman providing play-by-play.

Ownership
In February 1999, Western South Dakota Broadcasting LLC reached an agreement to purchase this station from Lovcom, for a reported $79,006. The station was then sold to Riverfront Broadcasting in 2019.

Honors and awards
In May 2006, KZZI won one first place plaque in the commercial radio division of the South Dakota Associated Press Broadcasters Association news contest. The contest was for the 2005 calendar year.

Translator

References

External links
KZZI official website

ZZI
Country radio stations in the United States
Butte County, South Dakota